The Deity Figure from Rarotonga is an important wooden sculpture of a male god that was made on the Pacific island of Rarotonga in the Cook Islands. The cult image was given to English missionaries in the early nineteenth century as the local population converted to Christianity. It was eventually bought by the British Museum in 1911.

Provenance
The wooden figure was made on the island of Rarotonga in the late eighteenth century or early nineteenth century. After Captain James Cook's first sighting of the archipelago in 1773, Europeans began to visit the Cook Islands in the early nineteenth century as part of the colonisation of territories in the Pacific. This went hand-in-hand with mass conversion of the population to Christianity. At that time British missionaries were very active in the area and this idol was probably given up to the London Missionary Society after 1827, when they set up a mission on Rarotonga. The LMS initially loaned their important collection of Polynesian sculptures to the British Museum but later sold it to the national collection in 1911.

Description
The small statue of the god is carved from highly polished ironwood (Casuarina equisetifolia). Shown standing upright, small anthropomorphic figurines are carved in high relief around the chest and arms. Coir bindings along the arm cover remains of a cloth and feathers that would have once been worn by the deity. The exact meaning and name of this masculine idol remains unknown but, based on its artistic style (particularly the distinctive formation of the eyes), it has been attributed to a workshop on the island of Rarotonga. Only one other similar figure, from the George Ortiz collection, is known.

See also
Hoa Hakananai'a
Statue of A'a from Rurutu
Mangareva Statue

Further reading
Catalogue: The George Ortiz Collection (Benteli Publishers Ltd., Bern, 1993), catalogue entry n°274
D. Idiens, 'A recently discovered figure from Rarotonga', Journal of the Polynesian Society, 85 (1976), pp. 359–66
T. Barrow, The art of Tahiti and the neighbouring society (London, Thames and Hudson, 1979)
P.H. Buck, Arts and crafts of the Cook Islands (Honolulu, B.P. Bishop Museum, 1944, Bulletin no. 179; New York, Kraus Reprint, 1971)
D. Idiens, Cook Islands art (Princes Risborough, Shire Publications Ltd., 1990)

References

18th-century sculptures
19th-century sculptures
Ethnographic objects in the British Museum
Artefacts from Africa, Oceania and the Americas in the British Museum
Oceanian sculpture
Wooden sculptures in the United Kingdom
Cook Islands culture
Rarotonga
Sculptures of the British Museum
Sculptures of gods
Cult images
Cook Islands–United Kingdom relations